Cédric Hervé (born 14 November 1979 in Dinan) is a French former road racing cyclist.

Hervé became a professional rider in 2002. His first win came in 2006 when he won the Manche Atlantique. Later that year he would also win the Grand Prix de Plumelec-Morbihan. In 2007 he participated in the Tour de France but withdrew from competition after stage 7.

Major results

2000
 1st Overall Kreiz Breizh Elites
2001
 1st Stage 5 Ruban Granitier Breton
2004
 3rd Châteauroux Classic
2006
 1st Val d'Ille Classic
 1st Manche-Atlantique
 1st Grand Prix de Plumelec-Morbihan
 2nd Overall Tour de Picardie
 5th Overall Tour du Limousin
 7th Boucles de l'Aulne
 8th Châteauroux Classic
 8th Tour de Vendée
 10th Grand Prix d'Isbergues

External links

1979 births
Living people
French male cyclists
People from Dinan
Sportspeople from Côtes-d'Armor
Cyclists from Brittany